The 1969 New Democratic Party of Manitoba leadership election was held on June 7, 1969 to choose a successor to outgoing leader Russell Paulley. There were two candidates for the party leadership: Edward Schreyer and Sidney Green. The contest was expected to be close, but Schreyer won a convincing victory on a strength of a powerful nomination speech. The final tally was 506 votes for Schreyer, against 177 for Green.

References

1969
1969 elections in Canada
1969 in Manitoba
New Democratic Party of Manitoba leadership election